Samuel Girard (born May 12, 1998) is a Canadian professional ice hockey defenceman for the Colorado Avalanche in the National Hockey League (NHL). After playing major junior hockey with the Shawinigan Cataractes, Girard was drafted 47th overall by the Nashville Predators in the 2016 NHL Entry Draft.  He briefly played for the Predators until he was traded to the Avalanche in 2017. Girard won the Stanley Cup with the Avalanche in 2022.

As a member of the Colorado Avalanche, Girard improved his on-ice success recording career-high numbers in his first three seasons. During the 2019–20 season, Girard joined fellow defensemen Cale Makar in the 30 points club, making the Avalanche the first team with multiple defensemen under the age of 22 who have at least 30 points since 1993–94.

He has also competed with Canada men's national junior ice hockey team at the 2015 Hlinka Gretzky Cup where he won a gold medal.

Early life
Girard was born on May 12, 1998, to family day care educator Guylaine and forklift driver Tony Girard. He was raised in Roberval, Quebec, Canada alongside siblings Jérémy, Christopher, and Jessica. Girard is also the nephew of Roberval mayor Guy Larouche and his grandfather Gaston Girard is a hockey trainer.

Both Sam and his brother Jérémy played midget hockey growing up; however, the family could not afford for both boys to play AAA and Jérémy gave it up.

Playing career

Youth
Girard began playing ice hockey when he was four years old. While attending Wilbrod-Dufour Pavilion, he began training with Mathieu Gravel in order to increase his muscular mass and stamina.

Girard played in the 2011 Quebec International Pee-Wee Hockey Tournament with a minor ice hockey team from Lac-Saint-Jean. While playing AA Bantam hockey for the Lac-St-Jean Espoirs, Girard was chosen to participate at the AllState Canadian All-Star Hockey Camp.  After graduating to the Quebec Junior AAA Hockey League (QMAAA), Girard drew interest while playing with the Jonquière Élites. Leading up to the 2014 QMJHL Entry Draft, he was considered a top draft prospect for the Quebec Major Junior Hockey League (QMJHL). After the 2013–14 season, he earned QMAAA First All-Star Team and Top Defenceman honours.

Junior
Girard was drafted third overall by the Shawinigan Cataractes in the 2014 QMJHL Entry Draft, making him the first player from Jonquière Elites to be drafted that high since Jean Imbeau in 1989. Girard moved in with power skating coach Julie Robitaille during his rookie season and trained with Mathieu Bellemare, and Bruno-Carl Denis to gain physical strength. Although he was drafted at 155lb, he bulked up to 164lbs by 2015. Robitaille also trained Girard at her power skating school, where he would later coach younger players as well.

In his first season with the Cataractes, Girard recorded his first career QMJHL goal on November 15, 2014, in overtime to beat the Rouyn-Noranda 5–4. By the conclusion of his rookie season with the Cataractes, Girard recorded 43 points in 64 games which earned him the Raymond Lagacé Trophy as Defensive Rookie of the Year. He was also nominated for the Rookie of the Year Award alongside Dmytro Timashov and selected for the All-Rookie Team.

In the following season, Girard continued his scoring success and recorded a career high 74 points in 64 games. He started his sophomore season by recording seven points in two games. Later in October, Girard was selected to compete in the CHL Canada/Russia Series for Team QMJHL. On November 2, 2015, Girard was named the Third Star of the Week after recording a goal and five assists in three games. He was eventually awarded the Emile Bouchard Trophy as the QMJHL Defenseman of the Year, the Frank J. Selke Memorial Trophy as the most sportsmanlike player, and CHL Sportsman of the Year. Leading up to the 2016 NHL Entry Draft, Girard was ranked 38th overall for North American skaters by the NHL Central Scouting Bureau.

Professional

Nashville Predators
Girard was selected by the Nashville Predators in the second round, 47th overall, in the 2016 NHL Entry Draft. He was invited to the Predators 2016 training camp and signed a three-year, entry-level contract on September 29, 2016. However, he was returned to the QMJHL to complete his final season of junior hockey. In his final season, Girard led the Shawinigan Cataractes in assists and tied for points over 59 regular season games. He was again selected to compete with Team QMJHL at the 2016 CIBC Canada Russia Series and named to the QMJHL First All-Star Team. After his season ended, Girard was reassigned to the Predators American Hockey League (AHL) affiliate, the Milwaukee Admirals, for the conclusion of the 2016–17 season. He recorded his first career AHL goal on April 14, 2017, in a 6–2 win over the Rockford IceHogs.

Girard made his NHL debut during the Predators 2017–18 season home opener on October 10, 2017 against the Philadelphia Flyers. He registered a –1 rating and recorded his first point with an assist on a goal by Filip Forsberg. Girard scored his first NHL goal in just his second game on October 12, 2017 against the Dallas Stars, he took a pass from P. K. Subban and put a slap shot over the shoulder of Stars goalie Ben Bishop; he also recorded an assist on a goal by Filip Forsberg. He remained on the Predators roster during the 2017–18 season and appeared in five of their first 14 games of the season before he was dealt alongside Vladislav Kamenev and a 2018 second round pick, in a three-team trade to the Colorado Avalanche, in exchange for Kyle Turris from the Ottawa Senators on November 5, 2017.

Colorado Avalanche
Girard joined the Avalanche in Stockholm, Sweden for their Global Series games against the Ottawa Senators. In his Avalanche debut at Ericsson Globe, Girard played top-pairing minutes and registered an assist, in a 4–3 overtime defeat to the Senators on November 10, 2017.

Upon returning to North America, Girard remained steady in the Avalanche's lineup. On December 23, 2017, Girard was sucker punched by Arizona Coyotes left winger Zac Rinaldo after Girard took exception to a hit on teammate Nathan MacKinnon. Two fights broke out, resulting in the ejections of Rinaldo, MacKinnon and Coyotes right winger Josh Archibald, with further disciplinary action against Rinaldo handed out after the game. Girard was not injured in the play and was able to finish the game.  After averaging 21:32 in his first nine games, Girard's ice time lowered to an average of 15:10. He ended the regular season with 23 points as he helped the Avalanche qualify for the 2018 Stanley Cup playoffs. He made his post-season debut in the first round against his former team but suffered an Upper-Body Injury which kept him out of the series.

During the 2018–19 season, Girard played in all 82 games and was tied second amongst Avalanche defensemen in points with 27. He also played an average of 19:53, including a career-high 26:36 on November 30 against the St. Louis Blues. On December 19, 2019, Girard was fined $1,957.89 for boarding Chicago Blackhawks winger Alex DeBrincat.  The Avalanche again qualified for the 2019 Stanley Cup playoffs and Girard was partnered with Erik Johnson in their first round matchup against the Calgary Flames. However, after suffering a shoulder injury, he was replaced by Cale Makar. After missing the conclusion of Round 1, Girard returned to the Avalanche's lineup for Round 2 against the San Jose Sharks. Once the team was eliminated from the Stanley Cup playoffs, Girard signed a seven-year, $35 million contract extension with the Avalanche, carrying an annual average of $5 million, on July 31, 2019.

Girard began the 2019–20 season with the Avalanche in the NHL. On January 2, he recorded a career-high four assists in a 7–3 win over the St. Louis Blues. Later that month, he played in his 200th career NHL game and became the longest active iron man streak holder on the team. In his 200th career game on January 11, Girard also recorded two assists in their 4–3 overtime loss to the Pittsburgh Penguins. He continued his third season by tying his career high of 27 points with a goal in a 6–1 win over the Buffalo Sabres on February 5. Girard would later join fellow defensemen Cale Makar in the 30 points club, making the Avalanche the first team with multiple defensemen under the age of 22 who have at least 30 points since 1993–94.

Girard participated in the Avalanche's run in the 2022 Stanley Cup playoffs until Game 3 of the second round series against the St. Louis Blues, when he exited the game after a hit from Blues forward Ivan Barbashev. The Avalanche reported that he had broken his sternum and would miss the remainder of the playoffs. In Girard's absence, the Avalanche would continue to advance to the Stanley Cup Finals and defeat the Tampa Bay Lightning to take the Cup.

International play
As a citizen of Canada, Girard has been given the opportunity to compete with Team Canada at multiple international levels. In his rookie season with the Shawinigan Cataractes, Girard was selected for Team Canada at the World U-17 Hockey Challenge. In 2015, Girard was selected to compete with Team Canada at the Hlinka Gretzky Cup. He played four games and recorded one point as Canada won a gold medal.

The next year, he was invited to Team Canada's 2016 National Junior Team Development Camp and 2017 National Junior Team Development Camp.

Player profile

Described as a smooth-skating and mobile player, Girard is compared to NHL defencemen Duncan Keith of the Chicago Blackhawks. Standing at 5-foot-10 in his draft year, Girard has also drawn comparisons to Brian Campbell due to his stature, "strong edge work and balance."

Ryan Kennedy of The Hockey News described Girard as "An excellent offensive defenseman who uses his smarts to get around the ice, Girard ended the regular season en fuego, with seven points in his last two games. Defensive play is a concern, but his escapability is uncanny when he has the puck."

Personal life
In 2019, the Benoît-Lévesque Sports Centre, where Girard played hockey growing up, created a recognition window which depicted about Girard's journey to the NHL. He was also invited to sit as honorary presidents of the cadet and juvenile division 1 School Hockey Championship with the Quebec Student Sports Network.

Girard is actively involved in helping raise funds for cystic fibrosis, which his cousin is afflicted by. In 2019, Girard and his father hosted a pocket game tournament to raise funds towards a cure for cystic fibrosis. He also donated a portion of his profits from the QMJHL to the Julie Robitaille's School of Power Skating who helped him train.

In 2018, as he was returning from a charity event, Girard fell asleep at the wheel while driving a Chevrolet Camaro and it struck the parapet, causing major damage. He maintained minor neck pain after the injury and was transported to Alma Hospital as a preventative measure.

Career statistics

Regular season and playoffs

International

Awards and honours

References

External links
 

1998 births
Living people
Canadian ice hockey defencemen
Colorado Avalanche players
Ice hockey people from Quebec
Milwaukee Admirals players
Nashville Predators draft picks
Nashville Predators players
Shawinigan Cataractes players
Stanley Cup champions
People from Roberval, Quebec